Burj Islam is a village in northwestern Syria, administratively part of the Latakia Governorate, located north of Latakia. Nearby localities include Salib al-Turkman to the north, al-Shabatliyah to the northeast, Ayn al-Bayda to the east and al-Shamiyah to the south. According to the Syria Central Bureau of Statistics, the village had a population of 5,652 in the 2004 census. Its inhabitants are predominantly Sunni Muslims from Turkmen ethnicity.

The village is a popular summer resort with a white rock beach.

References

Populated places in Latakia District
Populated coastal places in Syria
Turkmen communities in Syria